The Pont de Grenelle-Cadets de Saumur, formerly known as Pont de Grenelle (English: Grenelle Bridge. "Cadets de Saumur" is the name of the students of the Cavalry School) is a bridge that crosses the Seine River in Paris, France. It connects the city's 15th and 16th arrondissements, and passes through the Île aux Cygnes. Constructed of steel, it is a girder bridge. The current bridge was constructed in 1966, replacing an earlier bridge that had stood since 1873. The bridge passes behind a replica of the Statue of Liberty.

Origin of the name 
The name Grenelle Bridge comes from the name of the Grenelle plain that was accessible through this bridge. Grenelle was a town in the Seine department in 1830, before it became a part of Paris's 15th arrondissement in 1860.

On 18 June 2016, the bridge was renamed the "Pont de Grenelle-Cadets-de-Saumur" to honor the students of the Cavalry School who defended the Loire region in the Battle of Saumur that took place in June 1940.

References

Bridges over the River Seine in Paris
Bridges completed in 1966